Leptobotia elongata, the imperial flower loach, elongate loach or royal clown loach, is a species of botiid fish found in flowing water in the upper and middle Yangtze basin in China. Formerly common, the numbers of this vulnerable species have declined because of overfishing, dams (limiting its breeding migration), habitat loss and pollution. The species is bred in captivity and a stocking project has been in place since 2010. It is sometimes kept in aquariums, but require a very large tank.

Adults migrate upstream to spawn between March to May. They have been recorded feeding on fish, shrimp, gammarids, benthic invertebrates, aquatic insect larvae, mollusks, plankton and phytodetritus.

References

Botiidae
Freshwater fish of China
Fish described in 1870